Eric Hudson (born October 15, 1986) is an American Grammy Award-winning music producer.

Early life and career
His parents are Curtis and Phyllis Bivins-Hudson. Curtis is a songwriter and producer, and most notably the co-writer of Madonna's song "Holiday", co-written with singer/songwriter Lisa Stevens.

Hudson attended Columbia High School in Maplewood, New Jersey, and graduated in 2004.

He is a multi-instrumentalist (including piano, drums, bass, guitar, and organ), and honed much of his early music development playing in church and conducting his own jazz band called the Jazz Funk Project.

Hudson has played at Carnegie Hall and performed at the Apollo Theater in Harlem for the 2002 Democratic National Convention.

His early introduction into the industry began by working alongside legendary hip hop producers Buckwild and DJ Kay Gee from Naughty by Nature. Hudson was an instrumentalist on two ground-breaking albums, The Game's The Documentary and 50 Cent's The Massacre, which helped take his career to the next level. Soon after, he produced the song "Entourage" by Omarion.

Accolades
Hudson has won three Grammy Awards and has been a part of more than 60 million records sold worldwide, playing with artists including Whitney Houston, Mariah Carey, Chris Brown,  Ne-Yo, Leona Lewis, John Legend, Kanye West, Dr. Dre, Mary J. Blige, and Trey Songz.

Partial discography
2005
The Game - The Documentary
 18. "Like Father, Like Son" (feat. Busta Rhymes) (live bass and keyboards)

50 Cent - The Massacre
 21."I Don't Need Em" (live bass)

Wyclef Jean - Hotel Rwanda (original soundtrack)
 00. "Million Voices" (keyboards)

2006
Omarion - 21
 01. "Entourage"
 03. "Electric"
 11. "Been With a Star"

John Legend - Once Again
 06. "P.D.A. (We Just Don't Care)"
 
Mila J - "Good Lookin' Out" single
 00. "Good Lookin' Out" (feat. Marques Houston)

Ne-Yo - Because of You
 03. "Can We Chill"
 07. "Ain't Thinking About You"

Mary J. Blige - Reflections (A Retrospective)
 03. "You Know"

2007
B5 - Don't Talk, Just Listen
 11. "I Must Love Drama"

Lloyd - Street Love
 11. "Take You Home"

Beanie Sigel - The Solution
 04. "Go Low" (feat. Rock City)

Kanye West - Graduation
 09. "Flashing Lights" (co-produced with Kanye West)

Kevin Michael - kevin Michael
 05. "Vicki Secrets"
 13. "Too Blessed"

Chris Brown - Exclusive
 18. "Mama"

Leona Lewis - Spirit
 10. "I'm You"

Trey Songz - Trey Day
 09. "Fly Together" (feat. Jim Jones)

Mary J. Blige - Growing Pains
 14. "Talk to Me"

Jordin Sparks - This Christmas soundtrack
 2. "I'll Be Home for Christmas"

2008
Brandy - Meet the Browns soundtrack
 04. "Dig This"

Cheri Dennis - In and out of Love
 09. "Pretend"

Tiffany Evans- Tiffany Evans
 08. "About a Boy"

Raven-Symoné - Raven-Symoné
 03. "In the Pictures"

Cherish - The Truth
 06. "Before U Were My Man"

Jesse McCartney - Departure
 08. "Told You So"
 12. "Not Your Enemy"
 13. "Oxygen"

Nas - Untitled Nas album
 12. "Project Roach"
 00. "Who Are You"

Lloyd - Lessons in Love
 03. "Treat U Good"
 04. "Year of the Lover"
 08. "Love Making 101"

2009
Corbin Bleu - Speed of Light
 03. "Moments that Matter"
 05. "Champion"
 07. "Whatever It Takes"
 10. "Angel Cry"
 11. "Close"

Flo Rida - R.O.O.T.S.
 08. "Mind on My Money"

Jadakiss - The Last Kiss
 15. "By My Side" (feat. Ne-Yo)

Trey Songz - Ready
 06. "Does He Do It"

Whitney Houston - I Look to You
 08. "Worth It"

Fat Joe - Jealous Ones Still Envy 2 (J.O.S.E. 2)
 06. "Congratulations"

Mario - D.N.A.
 06. "Stranded"

Amerie - In Love & War
 02. "Heard 'em All"

Brandy - Unreleased
 00. "Love Me the Most"
 00. "Back & Forth"
 00. "Tell 'Em" (posted by Brandy on Twitter)
 00. "Bring It Back" (180)
 00. "Sober"

2010
Brutha - "Can't Get Enough" single
 00. "Can't Get Enough"

Trey Songz - Passion, Pain & Pleasure
 9. "Made to Be Together"

Jamie Foxx - Best Night of My Life
 02. "Best Night of My Life" (feat. Wiz Khalifa)
 07. "Yep Dat's Me" (feat. Ludacris and Soulja Boy)
 09. "Gorgeous"
 10. "Let Me Get You on Your Toes" (interlude)
 14. "All Said and Done"

Lyfe Jennings - I Still Believe
 06. "Whatever She Wants"

Jaheim - Another Round
 11. "Closer"

2011
Mary J. Blige - My Life II: The Journey Continues 
 06. "25/8"
 10. "Why" (featuring Rick Ross)

Professor Green - At Your Inconvenience
 10. "Doll"

Trey Songz - Inevitable 
 03. "I Do" (co-produced)
 05. "Sex Ain't Better Than Love" (co-produced)

2012
Tank - This Is How I Feel
 09. "Better Than Me" (co-produced)

Kendrick Lamar - GoodKid, M.A.A.D City
 01. "The Recipe" (additional keyboards)

Rick Ross - God Forgives, I Don't
 03. "3 Kings" (additional production, keyboards)

Trey Songz - Chapter V
 03. "Panty Wetter"
 14. "Without A Woman"

Bridget Kelly
 00. "Special Delivery"

Keyshia Cole - Woman to Woman
 03. "Missing Me"

Trevor Jackson - #NewThang EP (released Sept 2013)
 05. "Like We Grown"
 03. "One Girl"

2013
Justine Skye - Everyday Living (EP/executive produced)
 01. "Everyday Living"
 03. "Messin' w/ You" (feat. Joey BADA$$)
 04. "Hardwork" (co-produced)
 06. "Good by Now"
 07. "I Don't Wanna" (Aaliyah cover)

K. Michelle - Rebellious Soul
 02. "Damn"
 09. "Hate on Her"
 10. "When I Get a Man"

August Alsina - Downtown: Life Under the Gun
 07. "Don't Forget About Me"

2014
August Alsina - Testimony
 13. "Benediction"

Justin Bieber - single
 00.  "We Were Born for This"

Marsha Ambrosius - Friends & Lovers
 05. "Shoes" 
 09. "La La La La La"
 14. "Spend All My Time" (feat. Charlie Wilson)

K. Michelle - Anybody Wanna Buy a Heart?
 07. "Maybe I Should Call"

Omarion - Sex Playlist (co-executive produced)
 01. "Sex Playlist"
 04. "Inside"
 05. "Steam"
 08. "Work"
 09. "Deeper"

2015
Mariah Carey - #1 to Infinity
 19. "Infinity"

Tyrese - Black Rose
 03. "Picture Perfect" (produced with Rockwilder)
 10. "When We Make Love"

2016
K. Michelle - More Issues Than Vogue
 10. "Time"
 14. "Life I Chose" (Best Buy Bonus Track)

Jakubi - 61 Barkly 
 01. "Bank Account"

2018
Justin Timberlake - Man of the Woods
 08. "Morning Light" (featuring Alicia Keys)
 15. "The Hard Stuff"

2019
Nas - The Lost Tapes 2
07. "Who Are You" (featuring David Ranier)

2021
Blair Perkins - Blair Perkins
 03. "Boolin' (I'm Ready)"
 04. "Flight"
 05. "Voicemail (Interlude)"
 06. "Be Alone"
 07. "Care 4 Me"
 08. "Come With Me"
 10. "Exclusively Yours"
2022
The Isley Brothers - Make Me Say It Again, Girl
 05. "My Love Song"
 06. "Great Escape"

References

External links
 

1986 births
Living people
African-American record producers
American record producers
21st-century African-American people
20th-century African-American people